Sohar Sporting Club is an Omani sports club based in Sohar, Oman. The club is currently playing in the Oman Professional League, top division of Oman Football Association. Their home ground is in City of Sohar.

History
The club got promoted to the Omani League, top division of Oman Football Association after winning the promotion/relegation play-off in the 2012-13 First Division League against Al Tali'aa.

Being a multisport club
Although being mainly known for their football, Sohar SC like many other clubs in Oman, have not only football in their list, but also hockey, volleyball, handball, basketball, badminton and squash. They also have a youth football team competing in the Omani Youth league.

Colors, kit providers and sponsors
Sohar SC's fans - 2018–19 Oman Professional League

Sohar SC have been known since establishment to wear a full green or white (Away) kit . They have also had many different sponsors over the years. As of now, Falcon provides them with kits.

Players
Sohar SC - 2018–19 Oman Professional League

First-team squad

 
 
  
|-----
! colspan="9" bgcolor="#B0D3FB" align="left" |
|----- bgcolor="#DFEDFD"

|-----
! colspan="9" bgcolor="#B0D3FB" align="left" |
|----- bgcolor="#DFEDFD"

|-----
! colspan="9" bgcolor="#B0D3FB" align="left" |
|----- bgcolor="#DFEDFD"

Personnel

Technical staff

Management

References

External links
Sohar SC - SOCCERWAY
Sohar SC - GOALZZ.com

Football clubs in Oman
Oman Professional League
Sohar